A Beautiful Mind (1998) is a biography of Nobel Prize-winning economist and mathematician John Forbes Nash Jr. by Sylvia Nasar, professor of journalism at Columbia University. An unauthorized work, it won the National Book Critics Circle Award in 1998 and was nominated for the Pulitzer Prize in biography. The book was later adapted into the film by the same name in 2001 directed by Ron Howard and starring Russell Crowe as Nash.

Scope
Starting with his childhood, the book covers Nash's years at Princeton and MIT, his work for the RAND Corporation, his family and his struggle with schizophrenia.

Although Nasar notes that Nash did not consider himself a homosexual, she describes his arrest for indecent exposure and firing from RAND amid the suspicion that he was, then considered grounds for revoking one's security clearance.

The book ends with Nash being awarded the Nobel Prize in Economics in 1994. The book is a detailed description of many aspects of Nash's life, including the nature of his mathematical genius, and a close examination of his personality and motivations.

Reception
The book won the 1998 National Book Critics Circle Award for biography, was a finalist for the Pulitzer Prize for biography, and was shortlisted for the Rhône-Poulenc Prize in 1999. The book also appeared on the New York Times Bestseller List for biography.

Criticism
John Milnor notes the ethical issues posed by the book, an unauthorized biography and prepared without the cooperation of the subject.

Adaptation
The book inspired the film A Beautiful Mind, directed by Ron Howard and starring Russell Crowe and Jennifer Connelly as John Nash and his wife Alicia Nash respectively. It won numerous awards, including the Academy Award for Best Picture and Best Adapted Screenplay for 2001 at the 74th Academy Awards.

References

External links
Presentation on A Beautiful Mind by Sylvia Nasar for the Harvard Coop, June 24, 1999
Presentation on A Beautiful Mind by Sylvia Nasar for the National Alliance for Research on Schizophrenia and Depression, February 7, 2002

1998 non-fiction books
American biographies
Biographies and autobiographies of mathematicians
Unauthorized biographies
Biographies adapted into films
Simon & Schuster books
Universities and colleges in art
National Book Critics Circle Award-winning works